Johanna Jurva (born 16 May 1977 in Vantaa) is a Finnish politician representing the True Finns and member of the Vantaa City Council.

She was elected to the Finnish Parliament in the parliamentary election of April 2011. Jurva is a nurse by education.

References

1977 births
Living people
People from Vantaa
Finns Party politicians
Members of the Parliament of Finland (2011–15)
Women members of the Parliament of Finland
21st-century Finnish women politicians